Glen Allan McPherson (born April 3, 1957) was a Canadian politician who served in the Legislative Assembly of Saskatchewan from 1991 to 1995, as a NDP member for the constituency of Shaunavon and from 1995 to 2000 as a Liberal member for Wood River.

References

Saskatchewan New Democratic Party MLAs
1957 births
Living people
Saskatchewan Liberal Party MLAs
20th-century Canadian legislators